Gazla (also Romanized as Gazlā; also known as Gazlā Pā’īn) is a village in Kachu Rural District, in the Central District of Ardestan County, Isfahan Province, Iran. At the 2006 census, its population was 14, in 4 families.

References 

Populated places in Ardestan County